Demons' Score is a rhythm mobile game developed by iNiS and published by Square Enix. The gameplay is similar to another iNiS-developed game, Elite Beat Agents. The game was released for iOS in September 2012, and for Android on 21 December 2012. The game was disconnected on 29 September 2014.

Story
Serenity is just an average college girl, but when she suddenly loses contact with her father, Dr. Alister, she sets out to find him at the Salem State Hospital & Asylum where he works. Serenity arrives to find she barely recognizes the hospital anymore. Stepping warily into the shattered ruins, she meets a talking teddy bear. Introducing himself as David, the talking teddy bear claims to have once been human, but when Serenity asks him about her father's whereabouts, countless demons suddenly appear. Just before her father disappeared, he had sent a mysterious app to her smartphone. Known as the Demons' Score, the app is a powerful program that enables her to take control of demons that possess her body.

References

External links

2012 video games
Products and services discontinued in 2014
Action video games
Android (operating system) games
Dark fantasy video games
IOS games
Square Enix games
Music video games
Unreal Engine games
Video games about demons
Video games scored by Hiroki Kikuta
Video games scored by Keiichi Okabe
Video games scored by Kenji Ito
Video games scored by Naoshi Mizuta
Video games scored by Yoko Shimomura
Video games developed in Japan
Video games featuring female protagonists
Inactive online games